Jocelyne Dakhlia (born 1959) is a French historian and anthropologist. A director of studies at the École des hautes études en sciences sociales, her work is concerned principally with the political and cultural history of Islam in the Maghreb countries bordering the Mediterranean Sea.

Biography
The daughter of a French mother and a Tunisian father, Dakhlia was born in Bourg-en-Bresse and brought up in Tunisia. After studying history at the École normale supérieure de Fontenay-aux-Roses, she specialized in the anthropological history of the Maghreb. She earned a doctorate at the École des hautes études en sciences sociales (EHESS) which she joined in 1990, later becoming a director of studies. She is on the management board of Annales. Histoire, Sciences Sociales, and contributes editorially to Arabica and Revue du monde musulman et de la Méditerranée. A member of the Conseil scientifique de l'Institut d'études de l'islam, Dakhlia has coordinated studies on artistic creativity in the Islamic countries. Since 1990, Dakhlia has published several books and articles on developments in the Muslim countries and more recently has examined the effects of the Tunisian Revolution.

Dakhlia is a member of the French Unesco Committee and is a board member of the Museum of European and Mediterranean Civilisations.

Selected works
 L'Oubli de la cité, Paris, La Découverte, 1990  
 Le Divan des Rois. Le politique et le religieux dans l'Islam, Paris, Aubier, 1998 
 L’empire des passions. L’arbitraire politique en Islam, Paris, Aubier, 2005 
 Islamicités, Paris, Presses universitaires de France, 2005 
 Lingua franca : histoire d'une langue métisse en Méditerranée, Arles, Actes Sud, 2008 
 Tunisie, le pays sans bruit, Arles, Actes Sud, 2011, 
 Les musulmans dans l'histoire de l'Europe : passages et contacts en Méditerranée, Paris, Albin Michel, 2013, 
 Les musulmans dans l'histoire de l'Europe : une intégration invisible, Paris, Albin Michel, 2016,

References

1959 births
Living people
Writers from Bourg-en-Bresse
20th-century French historians
French women historians
French anthropologists
French women anthropologists
French academics
French women academics
ENS Fontenay-Saint-Cloud-Lyon alumni
Academic staff of the School for Advanced Studies in the Social Sciences
20th-century French women writers